The Vicariate Apostolic of Pando is a Latin Church missionary ecclesiastical territory or apostolic vicariate of the Catholic Church in Bolivia. Its cathedra is located in the episcopal see of Riberalta.

History
 April 29, 1942: Established as Vicariate Apostolic of Pando from the Apostolic Vicariate of El Beni

Apostolic Vicars
 Bishop Alfonso Manuel Escalante y Escalante, M.M. † (1943.01.13 – 1960.11.15)
 Bishop Thomas Patrick Collins, M.M. † (1960.11.15 – 1968.11)
 Bishop Andrea Bernardo Schierhoff † (1982.12.17 – 1986.12.01)
 Bishop Luis Morgan Casey † (1988.01.18 – 2013.02.02)
 Bishop Eugenio Coter (2013.02.02 – present)

See also
Roman Catholicism in Bolivia

References

External links
 GCatholic.org

Apostolic vicariates
Roman Catholic dioceses in Bolivia
Christian organizations established in 1942
1942 establishments in Bolivia
Pando Department
Roman Catholic ecclesiastical provinces in Bolivia